Leptothrix is a genus of Gram-negative bacteria in the class Betaproteobacteria.  The name is from the Greek  (literally '').  They occur in standing or slow-flowing, ferruginous, neutral to slightly acidic fresh waters with only low concentrations of organic matter. The energy metabolism of Leptothrix is strictly aerobic, oxidative, and chemoorganoheterotrophic. Five species are known: L. ochracea, L. discophora, L. cholodnii, L. lopholea, and L. mobilis.

References

Burkholderiales
Bacteria genera
Taxa named by Friedrich Traugott Kützing